Mónica Messa López (born 7 October 1966) is a former Spanish basketball player, captain of the Spanish team at the 1992 Summer Olympics. She won the gold medal at the 1993 European Championship.

Club career 
Born and raised in Madrid, she started playing basketball with school club Colegio Alameda de Osuna, and then she played at Real Canoe NC from her junior years to her debut in the Liga Femenina de Baloncesto, where she won 3 consecutive titles from 1984 to 1986.

As one of the most promising young players of her time, she got transferred to the Caja Toledo - BEX Banco Exterior project, with other young Spanish prospects in order to prepare for the 1992 Summer Olympics.

National team 
She made her debut with Spain women's national basketball team at the age of 19. She played with the senior team for 10 years, from 1985 to 1995, with a total of 185 caps and 4.3 PPG. She participated in the 1992 Barcelona Olympics, and four European Championships:
 7th 1982 FIBA Europe Under-16 Championship for Women (youth)
 8th 1983 FIBA Europe Under-18 Championship for Women (youth)
 4th 1984 FIBA Europe Under-18 Championship for Women (youth)
 7th 1985 FIBA Under-19 World Championship for Women (youth)
 10th 1985 Eurobasket
 6th 1987 Eurobasket
 5th 1992 Summer Olympics
  1993 Eurobasket
 9th 1995 Eurobasket

Notes

References

External links 
 
 
 
 
 

1966 births
Living people
Spanish women's basketball players
Olympic basketball players of Spain
Basketball players at the 1992 Summer Olympics
Shooting guards